Representative Assembly elections were held in French Togoland on 8 December 1946.

Background
The Representative Assembly had been created by decree on 25 October 1946 in line with Article 77 of the French constitution.

Electoral system
The 30 members of the Representative Assembly were elected by two colleges; the first college consisted of French citizens and elected six seats, whilst the second college (non-citizens) elected 24.

Results

Elected members
Nicolas Grunitzky was the sole elected member for the Togolese Party of Progress.

Aftermath
Following the elections, Sylvanus Olympio was elected President of the Assembly. On 23 December the Assembly elected Jonathan Savi de Tové as Togoland's member of the French Union Council.

References

1946 4
1946 elections in Africa
1946 in French Togoland
1946
December 1946 events in Africa